The Nobel Prizes are five separate prizes that, according to Alfred Nobel's will of 1895, are awarded to "those who, during the preceding year, have conferred the greatest benefit to Mankind." Additionally, the Sveriges Riksbank Prize in Economic Sciences in Memory of Alfred Nobel was established by Sveriges Riksbank in 1968 and awarded to a "person or persons in the field of economic sciences who have produced work of outstanding importance."

As of 2022, 61 Nobel Prizes and the Memorial Prize in Economic Sciences have been awarded to 60 women. Unique Nobel Prize laureates include 894 men, 60 women, and 27 organizations.

The distribution of Nobel prizes awarded to women is as follows:

 eighteen women have won the Nobel Peace Prize (16.3% of 110 awarded);
 seventeen have won the Nobel Prize in Literature (14.28% of 119 awarded);
 twelve have won the Nobel Prize in Physiology or Medicine (5.3% of 225 awarded);
 eight have won the Nobel Prize in Chemistry (4.1% of 191 awarded);
 four have won the Nobel Prize in Physics (1.8% of 221 awarded);
 and two, Elinor Ostrom and Esther Duflo, have won the Nobel Memorial Prize in Economic Sciences (2.17% of 92 awarded).

The first woman to win a Nobel Prize was Marie Curie, who won the Nobel Prize in Physics in 1903 with her husband, Pierre Curie, and Henri Becquerel. Curie is also the first person and the only woman to have won multiple Nobel Prizes; in 1911, she won the Nobel Prize in Chemistry. Curie's daughter, Irène Joliot-Curie, won the Nobel Prize in Chemistry in 1935, making the two the only mother–daughter pair to have won Nobel Prizes.

The most Nobel Prizes awarded to women in a single year was in 2009, when five women became laureates in four categories.

The most recent women to be awarded a Nobel Prize were Annie Ernaux in Literature and Carolyn R. Bertozzi for Chemistry (2022), Maria Ressa for Peace (2021), Louise Glück in Literature, Andrea M. Ghez in Physics, Emmanuelle Charpentier and Jennifer A. Doudna in Chemistry (2020), Esther Duflo in Economics (2019), Donna Strickland in Physics, Frances Arnold in Chemistry, Nadia Murad for Peace, and Olga Tokarczuk in Literature (2018).

Female laureates

See also
 List of female nominees for the Nobel Prize
 List of female nominators for the Nobel Prize

References  
General

Specific

Further reading
 

Nobel
Female
Female
Nobel